Maestas is a surname. Notable people with the surname include:

 Huberto Maestas, American sculptor
 Moe Maestas (born 1968), American attorney and politician
 Roberto Maestas (1938–2010), American activist
 Francisco Maestas, plaintiff in the case, Maestas vs. George H. Shone